The Israel women's national tennis team is the representative national team of Israel in Fed Cup competition. In the 2007 Fed Cup, they qualified from the World Group II and World Group Play-offs to reach the elite World Group for the first time in the team's history. They will participate within this group at the 2008 Federation Cup.

History

Members of the inaugural team
Mara Cohen-Mintz
Tova Epstein

2017

Israel lost to Georgia in relegation play-offs after finishing last in Pool D.

2018

Israel ranked ahead of Luxuemborg in win–loss percentage in Pool B. Israel was defeated by Denmark in the promotional play-offs.

2019
Finishing second behind Luxuemborg, Israel managed to reach the promotional play-off for second consecutive year but lost to Austria 2-0.

future
Without Julia Glushko and Shahar Peer, Israeli team face daunting task of qualifying for Europe Group I in the Fed Cup

Current team (2017)
Julia Glushko
Deniz Khazaniuk
Maya Tahan
Shelly Krolitzky

See also
List of Israel Fed Cup team representatives
Israel Davis Cup team
Canada Stadium

References

External links

Billie Jean King Cup teams
Tennis
Fed Cup